The Taking of Pando was a violent occupation of the city of Pando, Uruguay on 8 October 1969 by the guerrilla known as Tupamaros.

References 

Pando
1969 in Uruguay
Tupamaros
Pando